Blaž Trupej (born 2 February 1972) is a Slovenian tennis player.

Trupej has a career high ATP singles ranking of No. 571 achieved on 18 August 1997. He also has a career high ATP doubles ranking of 413 achieved on 25 June 1990.

Trupej represented Slovenia at the Davis Cup, where he had a W/L record of 10–10.

External links
 
 
 

1972 births
Living people
Slovenian male tennis players
Sportspeople from Ljubljana
Tennis players at the 1992 Summer Olympics
Olympic tennis players of Slovenia